General Hawkins may refer to:

Hamilton S. Hawkins (1834–1910), U.S. Army major general
John Parker Hawkins (1830–1914), Union Army brigadier general and brevet major general
Rush Hawkins (1831–1920), Union Army brevet brigadier general
Stacey Hawkins (fl. 1990s–2020s), U.S. Air Force major general